The Nordic Football Championship (commonly abbreviated NM or PM) was an international football competition contested by the men's national football teams of the Nordic countries. In the first tournament played 1924-1928, only Denmark, Norway and Sweden competed, but Finland joined for the second tournament, and at the last tournament played in 2000-2001, Iceland and the Faroe Islands also competed.

History 
The tournament was created on Danish initiative to replace a contract, ended in 1919, between the Danish (DBU), Norwegian (NFF) and Swedish Football Association (SvFF) that stated that the national teams of the three associations should play two annual matches against each other. However the idea was not realised until four years later, when the Danish association celebrated its 35th anniversary, and the first tournament was started. It was arranged by the DBU and was played as a single group where the three teams met each other five times for a total of ten matches each. DBU also provided the trophy of the first edition, a trophy that Denmark won when the tournament ended in 1928.

The second tournament was arranged by SvFF that celebrated its 25th anniversary, and this time the Football Association of Finland (SPF) was invited. It was also decided to play the tournaments over four years, with each team playing 12 matches, four against each other team, two at home and two away. The tournament was won by Norway, but the following nine tournaments, played between 1933 and 1977, were completely dominated by Sweden which won all of them. The fourth tournament was interrupted by the Second World War, and thus was played over eleven years, from 1937 to 1947.

The tournament gained popularity after the war and the matches were important for the Nordic national teams as preparation for larger tournaments such as the World Cup and the Olympics. But the tournament lost significance in the 1970s, partially due to the increased number of matches played against other international opponents, and thus the last three tournaments played in the 1970s and 1980s varied in length and format. The last match of the 1981-1983 tournament, between Sweden and Norway, was not even played as Denmark had already won. But the match was then played in 1985 after all.

A non-recurrent edition of the tournament was played in 2000-01, to which the Football Association of Iceland and the Faroe Islands Football Association were invited. Some of the matches were played during a joint training camp in La Manga Club, Spain, and the rest were played at home, some in indoor arenas. One match, between Norway and the Faroe Islands, was never played. The tournament was won by Finland for the first time.

Results

Medals

Summary
Source: https://www.rsssf.org/tablesn/nordic.html

Top scorers per tournament

All-time top scorers

Hat-tricks
Since the first official tournament in 1924–28, 41 hat-tricks have been scored in over 100 matches of the 14 editions of the tournament. The first hat-trick was scored by Sven Rydell of Sweden, playing against Norway on 21 September 1924; and the last was by Pål Jacobsen of Norway, playing against Finland on 21 August 1980. The record number of hat-tricks in a single Nordic Football Championship is ten, during the 1929-32 edition. The only player to have scored four hat-tricks is Jørgen Juve, three in 1929-32 (in which he was the top goal scorer with 17 goals) and one in 1933–36. He is closely followed by Sven Rydell who has three (all of whom came in the inaugural edition of the competition), and the next closest are Pauli Jørgensen, Erik Persson and Gunnar Nordahl with two hat-tricks each. The record for the most goals scored in a single Nordic Championship game is 5, which has been achieved on two occasion: by Gunnar Nordahl when he scored 5 for Sweden in a 5-3 win over Norway and by Erik Dyreborg when he scored his side's 5 goals in a 5-0 win over Norway. Sweden holds the record for most hat-tricks scored with 23, which is more than half of all hat-tricks. Finland holds the record for most hat-tricks conceded with 26, having conceded more than half of all the hat-tricks scored in the competition.

List

See also 
Women's Nordic Football Championship
Nordic Under-20, Under-21 and Under-23 Women's Football Championship
Nordic Under-17 Football Championship
Nordic Under-17 Women's Football Championship
Nordic Futsal Cup
Royal League

References

External links 
Nordic Championships at RSSSF

 
Defunct international association football competitions in Europe
International association football competitions hosted by Denmark
International association football competitions hosted by Finland
International association football competitions hosted by Norway
International association football competitions hosted by Sweden
Recurring sporting events established in 1924
Recurring sporting events disestablished in 2001
Inter-Nordic sports competitions
International men's association football invitational tournaments